Robert Kenneth Wilfort (born 2 June 1977) is a Welsh actor from Porthcawl, who has made many appearances on British television and film. He is best known for his role as Jason West in Gavin & Stacey His other television appearances have included roles in series such as Wolf Hall and Bridgerton.

Early life
Wilfort was born in Porthcawl, and now lives in South England with his long-term partner.

Career
Wilfort's film roles have included Dr Simon Griffith in Mike Leigh's All or Nothing (2002) and Rita Skeeter's photographer in Harry Potter and the Goblet of Fire (2005). He also had a minor role in The Libertine (2004) and co-starred in Man Up (2015). 

Wilfort played the history teacher Tom Barkley in the E4 teen drama series Skins and Mr Fisher in BBC's White Van Man. He also has a recurring role as Jason West in the BAFTA award-winning TV show Gavin & Stacey.

In 2008, he appeared in his underwear in an advert for Barclaycard, where he descends an enormous water slide from his city office, all the way through the city and back to his home. In addition, he featured in adverts for Crunchy Nut cereal and the London recycling campaign.

Since 2015, Wilfort has been the voice of Samson (UK/US) in the CGI series of Thomas & Friends. Also in 2015 he appeared as George Cavendish in the BBC's adaptation of Hilary Mantel's novel Wolf Hall. In 2015 and 2016, Wilfort played Bob Cratchit in the BBC drama Dickensian.

In 2018, he played the role of Lord Liverpool in Mike Leigh's Peterloo 
Theatre credits include plays at Chichester Festival Theatre, West Yorkshire Playhouse, Soho Theatre, Trafalgar Studios and Theatre Clwyd.

In autumn 2022, Wilfort portrayed Spike Milligan in the touring production of SPIKE, written by Ian Hislop and Nick Newman.

Filmography

Film

Television

Video games

References

External links

1977 births
Welsh male film actors
Welsh male television actors
Welsh male video game actors
Welsh male voice actors
Living people
Alumni of RADA
20th-century Welsh male actors
21st-century Welsh male actors